Elisha Matthew Mott (June 12, 1918 – February 25, 2001), known as Bitsy Mott, was a backup infielder in Major League Baseball who played for the Philadelphia Phillies.
 
Born in Arcadia, Florida, Mott played mostly shortstop, with stints at second base and third base. He made his debut in 1939 with the Americus Pioneers, a Brooklyn Dodgers minor league affiliate team. After playing for several minors teams, he joined the 1945 Phillies at the age of 27.

Mott batted .221 in 90 games for the Phillies, including eight doubles and two stolen bases, scoring 21 runs while driving in 22 more. He then returned to the minors for the remainder of his active career, retiring in 1957.

He later became personal security manager to Elvis Presley from 1955 to 1973, spending about 11 months of each year on the road with Presley and his manager Colonel Parker, who also was his brother-in-law. He also appeared in four of Presley's films, and was one of the selected few who actually attended Presley's funeral in 1977.

Mott died in 2001 in Brandon, Florida, at the age of 82.

References

External links

1918 births
2001 deaths
Major League Baseball shortstops
Philadelphia Phillies players
Americus Pioneers players
Augusta Tigers players
Cordele Reds players
Gainesville G-Men players
Havana Cubans players
Keokuk Kernels players
Little Rock Travelers players
Palatka Azaleas players
St. Petersburg Saints players
Tampa Smokers players
Tampa Tarpons (1957–1987) players
Utica Blue Sox players
West Palm Beach Indians players
Baseball players from Florida
People from Arcadia, Florida
20th-century American male actors